Twenty nine people have served as speaker of the House of Representatives of Malta since the office was established in 1921. The post did not exist in the period between 1933 and 1947 and also in the period between 1958 and 1962.

Political parties

See also
Speaker of the House of Representatives of Malta
Prime Minister of Malta
President of Malta 
Government of Malta
Parliament of Malta

External links
Former Speakers of the House of Representatives – Parliament of Malta

References

Speakers

Malta